The 21st Operational Weather Squadron provides weather support for all US Air Force and Army in the European and Africa Commands and is based at Kapaun Air Station, Germany.

Mission
The 21st Operational Weather Squadron provides highly accurate, timely and relevant environmental situational awareness to Air Force, Navy, and Army Commanders operating in US European Command in partnership with NATO. The 21st OWS is responsible for producing and disseminating mission planning and execution weather analyses, terminal aerodrome forecasts, and briefings for Air Force, Army, SHAPE, EUCOM, AFRICOM, USAFE, USAREUR, SOCEUR, and NAVEUR forces operating at 491 DoD installations/sites encompassing 92 countries and 23M square miles within the Atlantic Ocean, Europe, Russia, Africa and the Middle East.

This weather squadron is responsible for base or post forecasting, developing weather products, briefing transient aircrews, and weather warnings for all of their geographical units. Using automatic observing systems located at all military installations and communicating with their combat weather flights, the squadron is able to 'watch' the weather in their entire area of responsibility from one central location.

The Operational Weather Squadron is the first place a newly schooled weather apprentice will report. At the squadron, working alongside a seasoned weather professional, the forecaster is trained in all aspects of Air Force meteorology, from pilot briefing to tactical forecasting.

The weather squadron works closely with the combat weather flights they support to ensure a flawless exchange of weather information.

Personnel and resources

21st Operational Weather Squadron's manning consists of active duty, civilian and contract personnel and is located on Kapaun Air Station, Germany,  as an Air Combat Command tenant unit of Ramstein Air Base, Germany (USAFE).

Lineage
Activations and inactivations of the 21st Operational Weather Squadron:

1 Dec 1997: Activated as a unit
17 Feb 1999: Redesignated USAFE Operational Weather Squadron

Duty Assignments
List of duty assignments and parent units from 1997 to present.

Sembach Kaserne, Germany, Headquarters USAFE (1 December 1997 – 23 April 2012)
Kapaun Air Station, Germany (23 April 2012 – Present)

Emblem
The unit insignia was approved on 20 August 1998.

Meaning
Blue and yellow are the Air Force colors. Blue alludes to the sky, the primary theater of Air Force operations. The knight represents the unit's readiness and its dedication to support the warfighter and its role as a "keeper of peace". He leaps over a weather vane symbolizing a commander's ability to overcome adverse weather conditions due to accurate weather information provided by the squadron. The horse signifies the unit's key mission of carrying tailored intelligence information to operational customers and the ability to complete the Air Force mission. The lance carried by the knight denotes the squadron as the "tip" of weather forecasting services reaching into the theater to make a difference; the shield connotes the ability to safeguard those who may be in harm's way. The wind anemometer within the shield is a standard trademark for Air Force weather personnel and a key tool for the craft. The developing thunderstorm in the background symbolizes the weather hazards that may impede combat operations.

Awards
The unit has received the following awards:

Fawbush-Miller Award (1999, 2004)
USAF OWS of the Year (2005, 2008)

Commanders
Lt. Col. Ralph Stoffler, 1997–1999
Lt. Col. John Murphy, 1999–2001
Lt. Col. Carolyn Vadnais, 2001–2003
Lt. Col. Tim Hutchison, 2003–2005
Lt. Col. John Shepley, 2005–2007
Lt. Col. Brian Pukall, 2007–2009
Lt. Col. David Andrus, 2009–2011
Lt. Col. Eugene Wall, 2011-2013
Lt. Col. Gerald Sullivan Jr., 2013-2015
Lt. Col. Cedrick Stubblefield, 2015–2017
Lt. Col. Eric Muller, 2017-2019
Lt. Col. Jason Scalzitti, 2019–2021
Lt. Col. Allen Little, 2021-Present

References

External links
 USAFE Information
 USAFE Factsheet
USAFE article

Weather 021